Connecticut's 13th State Senate district elects one member to the Connecticut State Senate. It consists of the towns of Meriden and Middlefield, as well as parts of Middletown and Cheshire. It is currently represented by Democract Mary Daugherty Abrams, who has been serving since 2019.

Recent elections

2020

2018

2016

2014

2012

References

13